Lehartheater is a theatre in Austria.

Theatres in Austria
Buildings and structures in Upper Austria